Baseball in the 26th Southeast Asian Games were held at Palembang, Indonesia. All games were held at the Jakabaring Sport Complex.

Preliminary round

First game is at 10:00, and the second game is at 14:30, UTC+7.

November 13

November 14

November 15

November 16

November 17

Medal round

Bronze medal game
November 19, 10:00 a.m.

Gold medal game
November 20, 10:00 a.m.

Medal summary

Medal tally

Medalists

2011 in baseball
2011 Southeast Asian Games events
2011
International baseball competitions hosted by Indonesia